Work Later, Drink Now is a South Korean web series based on the Kakao Webtoon's Drinker City Women by Mikkang, starring Lee Sun-bin, Han Sun-hwa, Jung Eun-ji, and Choi Si-won. The first season aired on TVING for 12 episodes from October 22 to November 26, 2021. The second season aired on TVING for 12 episodes from December 9, 2022, to January 13, 2023.

The first season re-aired on television network tvN from February 3 to 18, 2022, airing every Wednesday and Thursday at 22:30 (KST) for 5 episodes.

Synopsis
Work Later, Drink Now tells the story of three women whose belief in life is one drink at the end of the day.

Cast

Main
 Lee Sun-bin as Ahn So-hee
 A workaholic broadcast writer.
 Han Sun-hwa as Han Ji-yeon
 A ditzy yoga instructor.
 Jung Eun-ji as Kang Ji-goo
 A stony origami YouTuber.
 Choi Si-won as Kang Book-goo
 An entertainment producer director (PD) working in the same department as writer Ahn So-hee.

Supporting
 Han Ji-hyo as Se Jin
 A girl who is not shy and has a bold style.
 Lee Hyun-jin as Ji-yong
 A handsome young man trapped in Ji-yeon's radar.
 Lee Soo-min as So-hyeon
 Yoon Shi-yoon as Han Woo-Joo/Mr. Nice Paper
 Lee Yoon-ji as yoga teacher

Special appearances

Season 1
 Jung Eun-pyo as Ahn So-hee's father
 Song Young-jae as Taxi driver
 Kim Ji-seok as Kim Hak Soo
 Ha Do-kwon
 Leeteuk
 Song Jae-rim as Song Pd
 Jo Jung-chi as Ahn So-hee's ex-boyfriend.
 Park Yeong-gyu as President Park
 Jung Seok-yong as Ahn So-hee Publishing Manager
 Shin Hyeon-seung as Kang Jigu ex-boyfriend

Season 2
 Yoo In-young as Kim Seon-jeong  
 Son Ho-jun
 Jo Yu-ri
 Jo Jung-chi as Ahn So-hee's ex-boyfriend 
 Lee Pil-mo as Han Ji-yeon's father

Original soundtrack

Season 1
Part 1

Part 2

Part 3

Part 4

Part 5

Season 2
Part 1

Part 2

Part 3

Part 4

Part 5

Viewership

Production
On March 9, 2022, it was confirmed that the series will aired at the Cannes International Series Festival 2022 from April 1–6, 2022.

Awards and nominations

References

External links
  
  
 
 

TVING original programming
Korean-language television shows
South Korean web series
South Korean drama web series
Television series by Bon Factory Worldwide
Television shows based on South Korean webtoons
2021 web series debuts
2021 South Korean television series debuts